Martha Lindley Blaine Trump (née Beard; born 1957) is an American socialite and philanthropist. For 29 years she was the wife of real-estate heir Robert Trump.

Early life and education 
Blaine Trump was born Martha Lindley Blaine Beard, and grew up in South Carolina, Florida and Alabama. Her father, Joseph Beard, was a top executive at IBM. Blaine and her family moved to Yokohama due to her father's job when she was ten. There, she attended the International School of the Sacred Heart. She later graduated from the American School of Paris in Louveciennes. She attended Bennett College in Millbrook, New York, and then the University of Tokyo before dropping out to marry Peter Retchin.

Career 
Trump has been a fundraiser for various organizations. As of 2019, she was vice chair of the board of directors at God's Love We Deliver, a nonprofit that delivers meals to people with severe illnesses in New York City. The charity was started in 1985 at the height of a health crisis, when in the AIDS pandemic many homebound individuals living with HIV/AIDS were living alone facing stigma, isolation, illness, and hunger. Trump is also a trustee of the American Ballet Theatre. 

In 1998, Trump received the Marietta Tree Award for public service from the New York City citizens' committee.

Personal life 
Blaine Trump has been married and divorced twice. First she was briefly married to Peter Retchin, with whom  she had a child in 1978, Christopher Hollister who is a real estate executive.

In 1984 she married Robert Trump, who worked in his property-developer family firm Trump Organization and they were together for 25 years, from 1984 to 2009. In October 2004, Blaine overdosed on pills and was hospitalized at Mount Sinai Hospital in Manhattan, New York after she learned her husband had bought a $3.7 million house on Long Island for his girlfriend, Ann Marie Pallan, who was his secretary for many years. They were involved in a lengthy divorce battle. The divorce was filed in 2007, went to court in 2008, and they reached a secret settlement in 2010.

In 2012, Blaine Trump put her $17.5 million mansion in Millbrook, New York, up for sale.

In 2017, Blaine Trump and her life partner Steve Simon attended President Donald Trump's inauguration ball in Washington.

References

External links
 

1957 births
American socialites
Blaine Trump
American Ballet Theatre
Philanthropists from New York (state)
American women philanthropists
Living people
University of Tokyo alumni
Bennett College alumni